TransJakarta Corridor 13 is the TransJakarta bus rapid transit route that serves from CBD Ciledug to Tendean BRT Station. The roads traversed by corridor 13 are HOS Tjokroaminoto Street (Tangerang), Ciledug Raya Street, Kebayoran Lama Street, Kyai Maja Street, Sisingamaraja Street, Trunojoyo Street, Wolter Monginsidi Street, and Kapten Tendean Street. Corridor 13 is the first Transjakarta corridor to operate on a primarily elevated route, running via a 9 kilometre long, 8 metre wide, dedicated elevated bus lane, with height ranging from 18 to 23 metres above ground level. A trial of the bridge operated on May 15, 2017. The route soft launched on August 14, 2017, with official operation starting 2 days later. The two main route variations are the Transjakarta Regular route, operating all stops for a 20-minute end-to-end journey, and the Transjakarta Express route, stopping only at CSW and Velbak stations, taking 10 minutes end-to-end.

On the first day of operation, PT. Transportasi Jakarta provides free corridor 13 services for 1 day from 09.00 to 19.00 with the Ciledug-Tendean, Ciledug-Blok M, Ciledug-UKI, Ciledug-Tosari and Ciledug-Ragunan routes.

On August 16 2017, the Governor of Jakarta Djarot Saiful Hidayat inaugurated the operation of Corridor 13 at the Cipulir BRT Station, South Jakarta. The inauguration was carried out ahead of the commemoration of the 72nd anniversary of the independence of the Republic of Indonesia. At the inauguration ceremony, the Chairman of the Jakarta Regional People's Representative Council, Prasetyo Edi Marsudi, the Mayor of Tangerang, Arief Rachadiono Wismansyah, the Main Director of PT. Transportasi Jakarta Budi Kaliwono, as well as DKI Jakarta Provincial Government officials and the directors of PT. Transportasi Jakarta. Even though a number of bus stops were inaugurated, there were still some that had not been completed, so they could not be operated.

Currently, the BRT Stations at Puri Beta 2, Puri Beta 1, Adam Malik, and Tendean at ground level and at JORR, Swadarma, Cipulir, Seskoal, Kebayoran Lama, Mayestik, CSW 1 and Tirtayasa stations along the elevated busway.

On November 12, 2018, PT. Transjakarta opened a new bus stop at CBD Ciledug. The extension of Corridor 13 to CBD Ciledug was slated to enhance the connectivity of public transport in the Greater Jakarta area. Due to the completion of Cakra Selaras Wahana (CSW) transit hub, TransJakarta decided to terminate the operation corridors 13A and 13B from 22 February 2022 onwards, while corridor 13C no longer serves several stations in corridor 1.

History

Corridor Construction 
The construction of the Transjakarta elevated lane started on Tuesday, 10 March 2015. Vice Governor of Jakarta, Djarot Saiful Hidayat has inaugurated the construction of the elevated lane for Corridor 13, with the route Kapten Tendean - Blok M - Ciledug, on Jalan Kebayoran Baru, Kebayoran Lama District, South Jakarta. The project, which cost Rp 2.3 trillion, was carried out by 8 different contractors at 8 different points.  The eight packages are the Tendean package (1,000 meters) done by PT Adhi Karya Tbk, the Santa package (1,250 meters) by PT Yasa Patrisia Perkasa, the Trunojoyo package (1,375 meters) done by PT Jaya Kontruksi, the Puring Park package (1,200 meters) done by PT Hutama  Karya, the Kebayoran Lama package (1,300 meters) is done by PT Pembangunan Perumahan Tbk, the Kostrad package (1,400 meters) is done by PT Istaka Karya CO together with PT Agra Budi, the Ciledug package (1,500 meters) is done by PT Waskita Karya Tbk, and the Seskoal Package (1,400 meters) was carried out by PT Wijaya Karya Tbk.

Corridor 13 is the first corridor that uses an elevated route, but in the development of the project it is not environmentally friendly, such as the CSW BRT Station which is not environmentally friendly because the number of steps is 117 and has a height of more than 23 meters. And in the 2017 Jakarta gubernatorial election it was mentioned that corridor 13, out of 10 BRT Stations only 1 used ramps and the rest used stairs.

It was planned that corridor 13 will use elevators and escalators because it is not environmentally friendly. The lift is planned to be built at the CSW BRT Station, while escalators will be installed at the Cipulir, Tirtayasa, and CSW BRT Stations. The CSW Intersection BRT Station is the only BRT Station using an elevator and escalator.

Trial run 

On March 14 2017, this corridor has already conducted a trial run for Transjakarta buses. PT Transjakarta plans to prepare a fleet of 100 buses and recruit 250-300 new drivers to serve the new route. Based on the initial simulation, Transjakarta buses can run from Ciledug to Tendean in 25 minutes. This travel time also includes stopping for 15-20 seconds at the 12 stops that would be used.

On May 6 2017, Corridor 13 began trials using 20 Transjakarta bus fleets. The trial was stopped the next day due to traffic disturbances in Ciledug and the Mayor of Tangerang City banned the buses to enter Tangerang, but eventually Transjakarta buses were allowed to enter the Tangerang City area on May 10, and were tested starting from May 12 until its inauguration.

On 12 June 2017, Corridor 13 failed to carry out a test by carrying passengers. This is due to the fact that several shelters have not installed doors that meet the standards and the wrong location of the counter holes which has the potential to hinder the flow of passengers at the shelters. Corridor 13 route still has no lights installed, so it can only operate from 06.00 to 17.00.

The schedule for the inauguration of Corridor 13 has been postponed from the original plan on June 22 to August 17 because the permit for a Certificate of Appropriate Function ( or SLF) from the Ministry of Public Works and Housing has not been issued so that the corridor 13 flyover has not been guaranteed safety according to the Ministry of Public Works and Public Housing. Apart from that, minor problems such as misplaced counter holes, automatic doors, and the absence of tap-in gates at several BRT Stations were still being fixed.

Corridor 13 has made a turning point at Puri Beta 2 Housing by conducting traffic engineering on the roads around Puri Beta Housing so as not to cause traffic jams. This traffic engineering has started to be implemented. At the Puri Beta 2 Housing, a Transjakarta bus shelter, Transjakarta route, and public transportation route were built.

After carrying out static and dynamic load tests on July 20, the Corridor 13 SLF was given by the Ministry of PUPR to the Governor of DKI Jakarta Djarot Saiful Hidayat on July 28 2017. The provision of SLF corridor 13 also coincides with the provision of SLF of two new ramps on the Semanggi Interchange.

Early operational 
Corridor 13 operates on August 13 2017. Even though it was already operating, Transjakarta buses do not stop at certain BRT Stations. Operational hours were also limited to 19.00 because the lights have not been installed on the route. In addition, the construction of lifts and escalators was still being carried out at several BRT Stations. The operation of the station was waiting for the completion of the installation of lights on the elevated route. It was targeted that all of these stops would be operational in October 2017 when the lights on the elevated route have been fully installed. PT. Transportasi Jakarta built the Puri Beta 1 BRT Station which is located not far from the Puri Beta 2 bus shelter so that passengers from the direction of Tangerang and Puri Beta 1 housing will be closer and more comfortable accessing the Corridor 13 bus.

Further developments 
On late March 2018, the Ciledug-Tosari ICBC Corridor 13C route began to be reversed by going through the Bendungan Hilir, Polda Metro Jaya, and Gelora Bung Karno BRT Stations from the Tosari ICBC direction. This route also extends its operating time until 19.00. On 9-10 April 2018, a trial was conducted to extend the operational time for all routes in corridor 13 until 22.00. Due to the incomplete lighting istallation along the elevated route, Transjakarta buses that pass through corridor 13 at night receive lighting assistance from a car guiding in front of them. On April 11 2018, corridor 13 officially operates until 22.00. On November 18, 2018, the CBD Ciledug BRT station was officially opened.

On March 2022, the construction of a pedestrian skywalk in Kebayoran Lama, South Jakarta was carried out. The construction of the skywalk at Kebayoran Lama is intended to connect Corridor 13 at the Velbak BRT Station to become a transit point to Corridor 8 via the Pasar Kebayoran Lama BRT Station, as well as to integrate with Kebayoran railway station which serves the Rangkasbitung Line. As a follow-up to the construction of the skywalk, the Velbak BRT Station was closed on August 29 2022 and Transjakarta users were diverted to use the Kebayoran Lama and the Mayestik BRT Station during the closure until it was reopened on December 24, 2022. The construction of the Kebayoran Lama skywalk underwent a public trial on 21-24 January 2023, and was inaugurated by the Acting Governor of Jakarta, Heru Budi Hartono on Friday, 27 January 2023.

List of BRT Stations 
 Stations indicated by a <- sign has a one way service towards CBD Ciledug only. Stations indicated by a -> sign has a one way service only towards Tendean.
 Currently, all bus stops (except CBD Ciledug) are served by buses 24 hours a day.

Cross-corridor routes 
Other serving the main route (Corridor 13: CBD Ciledug - Tendean), corridor 13 also serves cross-corridor routes as below:

 13B: Puri Beta - Pancoran Barat
 13C: Puri Beta - Dukuh Atas
 13D: Puri Beta - Ragunan (Weekend and Public Holidays Only)
 L13E: Puri Beta - Kuningan (Express Route, Working Days Only)

Discontinued cross-corridor routes are as follows:

 13A: Puri Beta - Blok M (temporary route prior to the opening of CSW-ASEAN TOD)
 13E: Puri Beta - Kuningan (replaced by express route L13E)
 13F: Puri Beta - Kampung Melayu

Corridor 13B (Puri Beta - Pancoran Barat) 

 Stations indicated by a -> sign has a one way service only towards Tendean.

Corridor 13C (Puri Beta–Dukuh Atas) 

 Stations indicated by a <- sign has a one way service towards Puri Beta only. Stations indicated by a -> sign has a one-way service only towards Dukuh Atas 1.
 *) Semanggi to Bendungan Hilir bus stop via skywalk bridge which is maybe too steep for disable person and takes at least 10 minutes walk.
 Italic text indicates that the BRT Station is temporarily closed for renovation.

Corridor 13D (Ciledug Puri Beta–Ragunan) 

 Only operates on weekends (Saturday-Sunday) and Public Holidays.
 Stations indicated by a <- sign has a one way service towards Puri Beta only. Stations indicated by a -> sign has a one way service towards Ragunan only.
 Italic text indicates that the BRT Station is temporarily closed for renovation.

Corridor L13E (Puri Beta–Kuningan) 

 Only operates on weekdays (Monday-Friday) and closed during public holidays.

 Stations indicated by a <- has a one way service towards Puri Beta only. Stations indicated by a -> sign has a one-way service only towards Latuharhari.

Fleets 

 Scania K310IB 6×2, white-blue (MYS)
 Mercedes-Benz OC 500 RF 2542 OM457LA ZF Ecolife, white-dark blue, sea ​​animals and land animals livery (TJ)
 Mercedes-Benz OH 1526 NG, white-light blue (TJ, regular bus)
 Mercedes-Benz OH 1526 NG, dark blue-white (TJ, PPD Vintage Series)
 Mercedes-Benz OH 1526 NG, red-white (TJ, special livery for the Indonesian Independence Day)
 Mercedes-Benz OH 1526 NG, white-pink (TJ, women bus)
 Mercedes-Benz OH 1626 NG A/T, dark blue-white (TJ, PPD Vintage Series)
 Mercedes-Benz OH 1626 NG A/T, dark blue-orange (TJ, PPD Vintage Series)
 Mercedes-Benz OH 1626 NG A/T, white-dark blue and orange (TJ, PPD Vintage Series)
 Hino RK1 JSNL, white-blue (TJ)

See also 
 TransJakarta
 CSW-ASEAN TOD
 List of TransJakarta corridors

References

External links 

 

Bus routes
TransJakarta